Morton Township may refer to:
 Morton Township, Tazewell County, Illinois
 Morton Township, Page County, Iowa
 Morton Township, Ottawa County, Kansas, in Ottawa County, Kansas
 Morton Township, Pawnee County, Kansas, in Pawnee County, Kansas
 Morton Township, Sedgwick County, Kansas
 Morton Township, Michigan
 Morton Township, Boyd County, Nebraska
 Morton Township, Knox County, Nebraska
 Morton Township, Burleigh County, North Dakota, in Burleigh County, North Dakota
 Morton Township, Day County, South Dakota, in Day County, South Dakota

Township name disambiguation pages